The British Lichen Society (BLS) was founded in 1958 with the objective of promoting the study and conservation of lichen. Although the society was founded in London, UK, it is also of relevance to lichens worldwide. It has been a registered charity (number 228850) since 1964.

History
At the instigation of Dougal Swinscow, the first meeting of the society was held at the British Museum on 1 February 1958; there were 24 attendees. Several positions were decided: Arthur Edward Wade was elected as the secretary, Peter Wilfred James as the editor and recorder, Joseph Peterken as the treasurer, David Smith the librarian, and Swinscow as curator and assistant editor. Another founder was Ursula Katherine Duncan.

A tenth-anniversary symposium, held jointly with the British Mycological Society, was held on 27 September 1968. In 1983, the BLS held its silver jubilee celebrations to commemorate 25 years since its founding. A one-day lichenology symposium was held at the Natural History Museum, London, covering the topics ecophysiology, ecology, and lichenology in the Southern Hemisphere.

Lichenologist Oliver Gilbert, former president of the BLS and editor of the organisation’s publications, wrote the book The Lichen Hunters in 2004; according to the blurb on the dust jacket, it is "part travelogue and part social history of the British Lichen Society from ... 1958 to the present".

Activities and publications
A series of events are held each year led by members of the society. These include field and indoor meetings and training events. In conjunction and with support from the BLS, the Field Studies Council started giving field courses on lichens in 1958, initially led by Arthur Wade and held at the Malham Tarn Field Studies Centre. These courses helped increase awareness and interest in field lichenology in the British Isles. In 1964, the BLS undertook the Society Distribution Maps Scheme, a major citizen science project led by Mark Seaward. This effort ultimately resulted in the 1970 publication Introduction to British Lichens, after which it became possible to reliably identify most lichens found in the UK. Distribution maps of species were distributed in the October 1973 issue of The Lichenologist, and this data was incorporated into other biogeographical lichen research, including studies on the effects of pollution on local lichen populations. The society also makes grants to support projects that study lichens. It works with other organisations.

The Society publishes a scientific journal, The Lichenologist, that focusses on the taxonomy of lichens as well as their ecology and physiology. It was founded by Dougal Swinscow   and edited by Peter Wilfred James from 1958 until 1977 and by Peter Crittenden from 2000 to 2016. There is also a twice-yearly members' bulletin, BLS Bulletin. This was edited from 1980 until 1989 (except not 1987) by Oliver Gilbert. The society also maintains a database of the lichens in England and Wales, a library based at the National Botanic Garden of Wales, and a herbarium.

Presidents
The BLS elects a new president every two years:

 1959–1962 David Catcheside
 1962–1964 Dougal Swinscow
 1964–1966 Arthur Wade
 1966–1968 Joseph Peterken
 1968–1970 Geoffrey Dobbs
 1970–1972 Peter James
 1972–1974 David Smith
 1974–1976 Dennis Brown
 1976–1978 Oliver Gilbert
 1978–1980 Frank Brightman
 1980–1982 Francis Rose
 1982–1984 Mark Seaward
 1984–1986 Jack Laundon
 1986–1988 David Hawksworth
 1988–1990 Brian Coppins
 1990–1992 David Richardson
 1992–1994 Frank Dobson
 1994–1996 Brian Fox
 1996–1998 Ray Woods
 1998–2000 Peter Crittenden
 2000–2002 Tony Fletcher
 2002–2004 Sandy Coppins
 2004–2006 David Hill
 2006–2008 Pat Wolseley
 2008–2010 Peter Lambley
 2010–2012 Stephen Ward
 2012–2014 Barbara Hilton
 2014–2016 Janet Simkin
 2016–2018 Allan Pentecost
 2018–2020 Paul Cannon
 2020–2022 Rebecca Yahr

References

External links
 

British biology societies
Mycology organizations
Organisations based in London
Scientific organizations established in 1958
1958 establishments in the United Kingdom
Scientific societies based in the United Kingdom